A steam railmotor or steam railcar is a carriage (railcar) that is self powered by a steam engine,

Operating Companies

Belfast and County Down
The Belfast and County Down Railway introduced three railmotors 1905 which lasted in service until 1918.

Dublin Wicklow and Wexford Railway
The Dublin, Wicklow and Wexford Railway had 2 steam railmotors, built by Manning Wardle.

Great Northern Railway
The Great Northern Railway of Ireland operated seven steam railmotors acquired 1906.

Great Southern and Western Railway
The Great Southern and Western Railway purchased a single steam railmotor in 1905.

Great Southern Railways
Great Southern Railways initially introduced four steam railmotors, Nos. 354 to 357, from Sentinel in 1927 which were withdrawn in 1941–2.  These were followed by six from Clayton in 1928, which were relatively unsuccessful and withdrawn in 1932 though the carriage portions were converted into three articulated non-powered pairs which remained in service until 1955.

Northern Counties Committee
The Northern Counties Committee obtained two new steam railmotors in 1905.

References

Footnotes

Sources
 
 
 
 

Railmotors
Steam locomotives of Ireland
Steam locomotives of Northern Ireland
5 ft 3 in gauge locomotives
Scrapped locomotives